South Carolina Highway 418 (SC 418) is a , east–west state highway in upstate South Carolina. It travels between U.S. Route 25 (US 25) in southern Greenville County and SC 101/SC 146 in southern Spartanburg County; it also travels through northern Laurens County.

Route description
The western terminus of SC 418 is at the junction of US 25 and SC 8 in Ware Place. It then proceeds in an east-northeast direction to Fountain Inn, crossing Interstate 385 (I-385) at exit 23 before entering the city. After the interchange, the highway intersects SC 14 and takes a north-northeast route, following almost parallel to the Greenville-Laurens County border. It then cuts across the northern corner of Laurens County heading through rural areas of the county without passing any incorporated towns or intersecting any other state highways. It travels across the Enoree River to head east into Spartanburg County, and coming to its east terminus on the outskirts of Woodruff at the intersection with SC 101/SC 146.

Major intersections

See also

References

External links

SC 418 at Virginia Highways' South Carolina Highways Annex

418
Transportation in Greenville County, South Carolina
Transportation in Laurens County, South Carolina
Transportation in Spartanburg County, South Carolina